Ancestry.com LLC is an American genealogy company based in Lehi, Utah. The largest for-profit genealogy company in the world, it operates a network of genealogical, historical records, and related genetic genealogy websites.

In November 2018, the company said to have provided access to approximately 10 billion historical records, to have 3 million paying subscribers, and to have sold 18 million DNA kits to customers. By 2022, this number had risen to 30 billion records according to the company. On December 4, 2020, The Blackstone Group acquired the company in a deal valued at $4.7 billion.

History

Ancestry

1990–1999
In 1990, Paul Brent Allen (not to be confused with Microsoft cofounder Paul Allen or the Allen Holdings CEO Paul Allen) and Dan Taggart, two Brigham Young University graduates, founded Infobases and began offering Latter-day Saints (LDS) publications on floppy disks. In 1988, Allen had worked at Folio Corporation, founded by his brother Curt and his brother-in-law Brad Pelo.
The service was initially to help members of the church to research their ancestors to support the church's practice of conducting baptisms for dead relatives/ancesters into the church. 

Infobases' first products were floppy disks and compact disks sold from the back seat of the founders' car. In 1994, Infobases was named among Inc. magazine's 500 fastest-growing companies. Their first offering on CD was the LDS Collectors Edition, released in April 1995, selling for $299.95, which was offered in an online version in August 1995. Ancestry officially went online with the launch of Ancestry.com in 1996.

On January 1, 1997, Infobases' parent company, Western Standard Publishing, purchased Ancestry, Inc., publisher of Ancestry magazine and genealogy books. Western Standard Publishing's CEO was Joseph A. Cannon, one of the principal owners of Geneva Steel.

In July 1997, Allen and Taggart purchased Western Standard's interest in Ancestry, Inc. At the time, Brad Pelo was president and CEO of Infobases, and president of Western Standard. Less than six months earlier, he had been president of Folio Corporation, whose digital technology Infobases was using. In March 1997, Folio was sold to Open Market for $45 million. The first public evidence of the change in ownership of Ancestry magazine came with the July/August 1997 issue, which showed a newly reorganized Ancestry, Inc., as its publisher. That issue's masthead also included the first use of the Ancestry.com web address.

More growth for Infobases occurred in July 1997, when Ancestry, Inc. purchased Bookcraft, Inc., a publisher of books written by leaders and officers of the LDS Church. Infobases had published many of Bookcraft's books as part of its LDS Collector's Library. Pelo also announced that Ancestry's product line would be greatly expanded in both CDs and online. Alan Ashton, a longtime investor in Infobases and founder of WordPerfect, was its chairman of the board.

Allen and Taggart began running Ancestry, Inc. independently from Infobases in July 1997, and began creating one of the largest online subscription-based genealogy database services.

In April 1999, to better focus on its Ancestry.com and MyFamily.com Internet businesses, Infobases sold the Bookcraft brand name and its catalog of print books to its major competitor in the LDS book market, Deseret Book. Included in the sale were the rights to Infobases' LDS Collectors Library on CD. A year earlier, Deseret Book had released a competing product called GospeLink, and the two products were combined as a single product by Deseret Book.

The MyFamily.com website launched in December 1998, with additional free sites beginning in March 1999. The site generated one-million registered users within its first 140 days. The company raised more than US$90 million in venture capital from investors and changed its name on November 17, 1999, from Ancestry.com, Inc. to MyFamily.com, Inc. Its three Internet genealogy sites were then called Ancestry.com, FamilyHistory.com, and MyFamily.com. Sales were about US$62 million for 2002 and US$99 million for 2003.

2000–2009
In March 2004, the company, which had outgrown its call center in Orem, Utah, opened a new call center, which accommodates about 700 agents at a time, in Provo. Heritage Makers was acquired by MyFamily.com in September 2005.

While the company had been offering free access to Ancestry.com at LDS Family History Centers, that service was terminated on March 17, 2007, because the company and the LDS Church were unable to reach a mutually agreeable licensing agreement. In 2010, Ancestry restored access to its site at Family History Centers.

2010–2019
In 2010, Ancestry sold its book publishing assets to Turner Publishing Company.

Ancestry.com became a publicly traded company on NASDAQ (symbol: ACOM) on November 5, 2009, with an initial public offering of 7.4 million shares priced at $13.50 per share, underwritten by Morgan Stanley, Bank of America, Merrill Lynch, Jefferies & Company, Piper Jaffray, and BMO Capital Markets.

In 2010, Ancestry.com expanded its domestic operations with the opening of an office in San Francisco, California, staffed with brand new engineering, product, and marketing teams geared toward developing some of Ancestry's cutting-edge technology and services. In 2011, Ancestry launched an Android and iOS app.

In December 2011, Ancestry.com moved the Social Security Death Index search behind a paywall and stopped displaying the Social Security information of people who had died within the past 10 years, because of identity theft concerns.

In March 2012, Ancestry.com acquired the collection of DNA assets from GeneTree.

In September 2012, Ancestry.com expanded its international operations with the opening of its European headquarters in Dublin, Ireland. The Dublin office includes a new call centre for international customers, as well as product, marketing, and engineering teams.

In October 2012, Ancestry.com agreed to be acquired by a private equity group consisting of Permira Advisers LLP, members of Ancestry.com's management team, including CEO Tim Sullivan and CFO Howard Hochhauser, and Spectrum Equity, for $32 per share or around $1.6 billion. At the same time, Ancestry.com purchased a photo digitization and sharing service called 1000Memories.

On July 16, 2015, Ancestry launched AncestryHealth, and announced the appointment of Cathy A. Petti as its Chief Health Officer. That year, Ancestry partnered with the Google subsidiary, Calico, to focus on longevity research and therapeutics, in an effort to investigate human heredity of lifespan.

In April 2016, GIC Private Limited (a sovereign wealth fund owned by the Government of Singapore) and Silver Lake (a private equity fund manager) bought equity stakes in Ancestry.com. The estimated market value of Ancestry.com in 2017 was more than $3 billion.

Through vintage photographs, a woman was able to document eight generations of her family, dating back to 1805, including an interracial couple. A controversial Ancestry.com advertisement had run on television stations in Utah, showing a slavery-era interracial couple. The advertisement was criticized by a news correspondent for Boston radio station WBUR-FM and MSNBC, and law professor Melissa Murray, on the grounds that it romanticized slavery in the antebellum South. In April 2019, Ancestry withdrew the advertisement with an apology.

In November 2018, Ancestry claimed to have over 10 billion digitised records and over three-million paying customers.

In December 2018, after authorities arrested the Golden State Killer and used GEDmatch to solve the case, Ancestry.com and 23andMe announced a data policy that they would not allow their DNA profiles to be used for crime solving without a valid legal process such as a search warrant, as they believe it violates users' privacy. In the 2021 case of the murder of George Seitz, Ancestry.com was used to help identify the remains of a crime victim.

2020–present
In August 2020, The Blackstone Group announced plans to acquire Ancestry for $4.7 billion.

In February 2021, Ancestry announced Deb Liu, a former Facebook executive, as their CEO effective March 1.

In November 2021, Ancestry announced that they have acquired French Genealogy Company Geneanet.

AncestryDNA
AncestryDNA is a subsidiary of Ancestry LLC. AncestryDNA offers a direct-to-consumer genealogical DNA test. Consumers provide a sample of their DNA to the company for analysis. AncestryDNA then uses DNA sequences to infer family relationships with other Ancestry DNA users and to provide what it calls an "ethnicity estimate". This "ethnicity estimate" uses 700,000 markers which is only about .02% of all genetic markers that could be tested. Customers should not believe they are seeing all of their ethnic background, but taking multiple tests is useful when combined with using ancestry.com's genealogy web searches to find possible unexpected admixtures. Previously, Ancestry.com also offered paternal Y-chromosome DNA and maternal mitochondrial DNA tests, but those were discontinued in June 2014. The company describes the technical process of testing in a scientific white paper. In July 2020, the company claimed that their database contained 18 million completed DNA kits bought by customers.

Ancestry DNA is commonly used for donor conceived persons to find their biological siblings and in some cases their sperm or egg donor.

The testing itself is performed by Quest Diagnostics.

For the people who activate the DNA test, Ancestry offers the possibility to participate into Human Diversity Project, a "scientific research project aimed at helping scientists better understand population history, human migration, and human health".

FindAGrave

On September 30, 2013, Ancestry.com announced its acquisition of Find a Grave. Site editor Jim Tipton said of the purchase that Ancestry.com had "been linking and driving traffic to the site for several years. Burial information is a wonderful source for people researching their family history". Ancestry.com launched a mobile app in March 2014.

Fold3
Fold3 is an online database with military records, including stories, photos, and personal documents.

Newspapers.com
In 2012, Ancestry spun off its digitized online newspaper components into a standalone service, Newspapers.com. Before the Newspapers.com launch, Ancestry.com acquired the following newspaper-oriented components, including scanning and digital technologies and posting on their website: 
iArchives, Inc., and its footnote.com service, was acquired in 2010 for 1.022 million common stock shares. The purchase brought in assets including processes for digitalizing documents on microfilm. Footnote would be rebranded Fold3 in 2011.
Archives.com was bought for $100 million in 2012. As of June 23, 2019, the archive claimed its index comprised online newspapers dating from 1700 worldwide, covering 12,100+ newspapers and a total of more than 509 million pages.

The website's principal competitor is newspaperarchive.com which claims it has online newspapers dating from 1607 worldwide, and its index in June 2018 includes 9,829 newspapers. Both websites have similar models for increasing their databases: striking deals with libraries, publishers and historical organizations to scan the publications for free to include in their database. Some participants see the process of free scanning as an easier, cheaper and quicker way to get their publications online than working through the U.S. government-operated National Digital Newspaper Program.

RootsWeb
RootsWeb, acquired by Ancestry in June 2000, is a free genealogy community that uses online forums, mailing lists, and other resources to help people research their family history. Users can upload GEDCOM files of their information for others to search at the WorldConnect portion of the site. Trees uploaded to WorldConnect are searchable at both the RootsWeb and Ancestry websites.

On December 20, 2017, a file containing 300,000 RootsWeb user names, passwords, and email addresses was exposed to the internet. The 300,000 records were from RootsWeb surname list service; 55,000 of those records were also Ancestry.com login credentials.

We Remember
We Remember is a free online memorial platform, which was launched by Ancestry in November 2017. It allows users to create a space to preserve and share photos and videos about the deceased.

Forces War Records
Acquired by Ancestry on May 24, 2021, Forces War Records is the leading British military genealogy-specialist website with a unique product that helps people both discover and contextualize their family's military history.

Past products
 Family Origins
 Family Tree Maker, sold in 2017.
 Genealogy.com, which maintains a genealogy research website, was acquired by MyFamily.com in 2003.
 Generations Family Tree (originally called "Reunion for Windows")
 MyFamily.com allowed members to create private family, or group, websites. In May 2010, MyFamily closed its Bellevue, Washington, development office, effectively letting its entire staff go since none of the staff accepted an offer to move to Provo. Ancestry shut down MyFamily.com on September 5, 2014. At the time of the shutdown, MyFamily had not resolved discontent with the downloading process, which consisted of capturing miscellaneous uncatalogued photos, with alphanumeric names and no data attached, and various calendar documents, thus leaving behind the associated data, File Cabinet documents, family recipes, and all other information.
 ROOTS software series by CommSoft was one of the first publishers of series of genealogy software programs, created in the 1980s, and available until 1997. Commsoft released the following: ROOTS89 for the Heath H-8 series of personal computers; ROOTS/M for the CP/M operating system; and ROOTS II for MS-DOS, followed by ROOTS III and ROOTS IV; and ROOTS V for Windows along with Visual ROOTS for Microsoft Windows.
 Ultimate Family Tree (UFT)

See also 
 23andMe
 Genographic Project
 iArchives, Inc.

References

Further reading

External links
 

Genetic genealogy companies
Genealogy software
Applied genetics
Internet properties established in 1996
American companies established in 1996
Biotechnology companies established in 1996
American genealogy websites
Online companies of the United States
Privately held companies based in Utah
Software companies based in Utah
Software companies established in 1996
Sovereign wealth fund portfolio companies
Permira companies
Silver Lake (investment firm) companies
1996 establishments in Utah
Companies formerly listed on the Nasdaq
Software companies of the United States
2016 mergers and acquisitions
2020 mergers and acquisitions
Companies based in Utah County, Utah
Lehi, Utah
The Blackstone Group companies